Guy Robert Teafatiller (born May 10, 1964) is a former American football defensive tackle who played three games for the Chicago Bears of the National Football League in 1987. He played college football at University of Illinois.

References 

1964 births
Living people
People from Concord, California
Sportspeople from the San Francisco Bay Area
Players of American football from California
American football defensive tackles
Illinois Fighting Illini football players
Chicago Bears players